Naomi Wallace (born 1960) is an American playwright, screenwriter and poet from Kentucky. She is widely known for her plays, and has received several distinguished awards for her work.

Biography

Naomi Wallace was born in Prospect, Kentucky, to Henry F. Wallace, a photo journalist and correspondent for Time and Life magazines, and Sonja de Vries, a Dutch justice and human rights worker.

Wallace obtained a Bachelor of Arts degree from Hampshire College. She then received two master's degrees from the University of Iowa. Currently, she divides her time between Kentucky and the Yorkshire Dales in Northern England (UK), where she lives with her partner, Bruce McLeod, with whom she has three children.

Wallace has taught English literature, poetry and playwrighting at Yale University, UCLA, University of Iowa,  Illinois State University, Merrimack College, Hampshire College, American University of Cairo, Vrije University of Amsterdam and other institutions.  She has also worked with women in the criminal justice system, and is a member of SURJ, Showing up for Racial Justice. She has been called "a dedicated advocate for justice and human rights in the U.S. and abroad, and Palestinian rights in the Middle East," and her writing described as "muscular, devastating, and unwavering."

In the mid-2000s, Wallace was briefly detained by Homeland Security after defying the ban on travel to Cuba.

In August 2016, Wallace was one of the Freedom Riders with the Women's Boat to Gaza.

Wallace is a supporter of the B.D.S. movement and Jewish Voices for Peace.

Publications

Wallace's plays are published in the U.S. by Broadway Play Publishing Inc., Theatre Communications Group, Faber and Faber in the UK, and éditions Théâtrales in France. Wallace's work has been produced in the United States, United Kingdom, Europe, and the Middle East.

Awards
Wallace's work has received the Susan Smith Blackburn Prize (twice), the Joseph Kesselring Prize, the Fellowship of Southern Writers Drama Award, and an Obie Award.  She is also a recipient of the MacArthur Fellowship, and a National Endowment for the Arts development grant.

In 2009, One Flea Spare was incorporated into the permanent répertoire of the French National Theatre, the Comédie-Française, and produced there in 2012. Wallace is the only living American playwright to enter the répertoire. Only two American playwrights have ever been added to La Comédie's repertoire in 300 years: the other being Tennessee Williams. The play was translated into French by Dominique Hollier.

In 2012, Wallace was a recipient of the Horton Foote Prize for most promising new American play.

In 2013, she was awarded the inaugural Windham–Campbell Literature Prize established at Yale University.

In 2015, Wallace received an Arts and Letters Award in Literature from the American Academy of Arts and Letters.  The award citation reads:  "Naomi Wallace is a powerful and essential voice who brings to the theater great lyricism and moral courage.  Her characters, so cruelly treated and often destroyed, speak with a direct and devastating poetry.  Never does this dramatist mollify or fail to engage us on the deepest level, and her three "Visions" of the Middle East that comprise  The Fever Chart are short, stark masterworks."

Work

Signature Theater, the Off Broadway company that has historically mounted a season of plays, produced three of Wallace's plays in 2014–2015, including the world premiere of Night is a Room.

Plays
 In The Heart of America
 One Flea Spare
 The Inland Sea
 Slaughter City
 The Trestle at Pope Lick Creek
 The Girl Who Fell Through a Hole in Her Jumper (with Bruce E. J. McLeod; licensed under the title The Girl Who Fell Through a Hole in Her Sweater in the United States)
 The War Boys
 Things of Dry Hours
 Birdy (an adaptation of William Wharton's novel)
 The Fever Chart: Three Visions of the Middle East
 Twenty One Positions: A Cartographic Dream of the Middle East (co-written with Lisa Schlesinger and AbdelFattah Abu Srour)
 The Hard Weather Boating Party
 One Short Sleepe
 And I and Silence
 The Liquid Plain
 Night is a Room
 Barrel Wave
 Returning to Haifa (co-adapted with Ismail Khalid)

Anthologies
 
 Inside/Outside: Six Plays from Palestine and the Diaspora
Double Exposure: Plays of the Jewish and Palestinian Diasporas

Essays
 Trump-ocalypse Now? Theater in the Age of Trump

 Radical Vision and Form

 Let the Right One In: On resistance, hospitality and new writing for the American stage

 Robin D. G. Kelley's introduction to The Liquid Plain

Poetry

Films
 Lawn Dogs
 The War Boys, co-written with Bruce E. J. McLeod
 Flying Blind, co-written with Bruce E. J. McLeod

References

External links
Naomi Wallace, Broadway Play Publishing Inc Playwright of the Year 1997

1960 births
Living people
20th-century American dramatists and playwrights
Hampshire College alumni
University of Iowa alumni
MacArthur Fellows
Writers from Kentucky
20th-century American women writers
21st-century American dramatists and playwrights
21st-century American women writers
American women dramatists and playwrights
American people of Dutch descent